The Aryanpur Progressive English–Persian Dictionary, in six volumes, is an English–Persian dictionary written by Abbas Arianpour Kashani and Manouchehr Arianpour Kashani published with Computer World, a publication company in Tehran, Iran.

References 

Iranian books
English dictionaries
Persian dictionaries